Richard Carlyle (May 21, 1879 – June 12, 1942) was a Canadian born stage and film actor. He is not to be confused with later actor Richard Carlyle. After stage experience, he began appearing in silent films in 1913.

Selected filmography

The Bridge of Sighs (1915) - Bill Stevens
The Purple Night (1915, Short) - Stanley Cross - Carol's Fiance
An Enemy to Society (1915)
Wilful Peggy (1915, Short)
A Bold Deception (1917, Short)
Spotlight Sadie (1919)
The Copperhead (1920) - Lem Tollard
The Stolen Kiss (1920) - James Burrell
The Inside of the Cup (1921) - Richard Garvin
Out of the Chorus (1921) - Maddox
Ten Nights in a Bar Room (1921) - The Village Doctor
Women Men Marry (1922) - Adam Page
Back Home and Broke (1922) - John Thorne
Haldane of the Secret Service (1923) - Joe Ivors
Shootin' Irons (1927) - Jim Blake
Lingerie (1928) - Pembrokee
Brotherly Love (1928) - Warden Brown
Taking a Chance (1928) - Dan Carson
Children of the Ritz (1929) - Mr. Pennington
Hearts in Dixie (1929) - White Doctor
It Can Be Done (1929) - Rogers
The Valiant (1929) - Father Daly
The Girl in the Show (1929) - Leon Montrose
In Old California (1929) - Arturo
Playing Around (1930) - Pa Miller
Guilty? (1930) - Dr. Bennett
Hide-Out (1930) - Dean
Mountain Justice (1930) - Judge Keats
The Girl of the Golden West (1930) - Jim Larkins
Kismet (1930) - The Muezzin
Tol'able David (1930) - Doctor
Five Star Final (1931) - First Newstand Proprietor (uncredited)
Quick Trigger Lee (1931) - John 'Dad' Sanders
West of Broadway (1931) - Butler (uncredited)
The Wide Open Spaces (1931, Short) - The Masque
The Saddle Buster (1932) - Bible Jude
Rule 'Em and Weep (1932, Short) - The Masque
Unholy Love (1932) - Mr. Bailey
Midnight Club (1933) - Minor Role (uncredited)
Sons of Steel (1934) - Tom Mason
When a Man's a Man (1935) - Dean Baldwin - Cross Triangle Owner
Public Opinion (1935) - Dr. Rand
Happiness C.O.D. (1935) - Rev. Huxley
Tango (1936) - Minor Role (uncredited)
The Country Doctor (1936) - Bishop (uncredited)
The Lion Man (1936) - Hassan El Dinh (final film role)

References

External links

1879 births
1942 deaths
Male actors from Ontario
Canadian male film actors
Canadian male stage actors
People from Guelph
Canadian emigrants to the United States
Male Western (genre) film actors